The 1991 Gloucester City Council election took place on 2 May 1991 to elect members of Gloucester City Council in England.

Results  

|}

Ward results

Barnwood

Barton

Eastgate

Hucclecote

Kingsholm

Linden

Longlevens

Matson

Podsmead

Quedgeley

Tuffley

Westgate

References

1991 English local elections
1991
1990s in Gloucestershire